Baile Mhuilinn is a Scottish Gaelic television series for children. The first series was broadcast in 1998.

Baile Mhuilinn features comedian and entertainer Tormod MacGill-Eain as the Miller, his pantomime horse Eachann, and alternating characters played by Màiri NicAonghais and Dàibhidh Walker. The format is standard: a dialogue in the mill includes songs sung by Eachann, and the company then move to a lounge where the miller reads a story.

Together with the radio series Fiream Faram, broadcast the same year, Baile Mhuilinn was the first specially devised education series aimed at children in the early stages of immersion-phase language-learning. The spread of Gaelic medium education in Scotland and also Gaelic pre-school provision led to many children attending immersion programmes even though Gaelic was not used in their homes. Baile Mhuilinn pitches its language at the needs of this group.

References

See also
 Gaelic broadcasting in Scotland

Scottish Gaelic mass media
BBC Alba shows